Events from the year 1754 in Scotland.

Incumbents

Law officers 
 Lord Advocate – William Grant of Prestongrange; then Robert Dundas the younger
 Solicitor General for Scotland – Patrick Haldane of Gleneagles, jointly with Alexander Hume

Judiciary 
 Lord President of the Court of Session – vacant until 22 January; then Lord Glendoick
 Lord Justice General – Lord Ilay
 Lord Justice Clerk – Lord Tinwald

Events 
 25 March – Lord Harwicke's Marriage Act 1753 "for the Better Preventing of Clandestine Marriage" comes into force in England and Wales, giving increased incentive for couples to contract Border marriages in Scotland.
 14 May – The Royal and Ancient Golf Club of St Andrews is founded as the Society of St Andrews Golfers, a group of players on St Andrews Links.
 22 May – In fiction, the village of Brigadoon disappears into the Highland mist (alternate sources say 1747).  
 11 July – William Burnett establishes the Aberdeen law firm that will continue in business as Burnett and Reid into the 21st century.
 The Select Society is established as The St Giles' Society by a group of 15 Edinburgh intellectuals, part of the Scottish Enlightenment.
 Old Spey Bridge at Grantown-on-Spey is completed by the military.
 Chemist Joseph Black discovers "carbonic acid gas", i.e. carbon dioxide.

Births 
 9 June – Francis Mackenzie, 1st Baron Seaforth, soldier and clan chief (died 1815)
 2 August – Lady Charlotte Murray, botanist (died 1808 in Bath)
 21 August – William Murdoch, inventor (died 1839 in Birmingham)
 Grace Elliott, née Dalrymple, courtesan and socialite (died 1823 in France)
 John Graham, painter (died 1817)
 William John Gray, 13th Lord Gray, soldier (suicide 1807)

Deaths 
 25 March – William Hamilton, exiled Jacobite poet (born 1704)
 2 June – Ebenezer Erskine, Secessionist minister (born 1680)
 17 June – George Ross, 13th Lord Ross (born 1681)
 27 July – Patrick Grant, Lord Elchies, judge (born 1691)
 19 August
 John Pringle, Lord Haining, lawyer, politician, judge and landowner (born c. 1674)
 William Ross, 14th Lord Ross (born c. 1720)
 23 August – William Cleghorn, philosopher (born 1718)
 2 September – Alexander Leslie, 5th Earl of Leven (born 1695)

See also 

 Timeline of Scottish history

References 

 
Years of the 18th century in Scotland
Scotland
1750s in Scotland